Below is a list of museums in Equatorial Guinea.

List
 Claretian Mission Ethnological Museum
 Museum of Modern Art Equatorial Guinea

See also
 List of museums

External links
 Museums in Equatorial Guinea

Equatorial Guinea
Equatorial Guinea education-related lists
Equatorial Guinea
Museums